Maria Conchita Gélabert (1857–1922) was a lyrical artist and actress of Spanish origin who performed in France at the end of the 19th century.

Biography 
Born in Madrid, Gélabert entered the Conservatoire de Paris in 1873 and obtained a first run off in opéra comique in 1876. In 1877, she was hired at the Théâtre des Folies-Dramatiques where she created Les Cloches de Corneville, then at the Théâtre de la Gaîté, Le Voyage de Suzette, La Fille du tambour-major.

Because of an unfortunate love story, she abandoned the theatre in 1890, and lived in retirement since then. She died alone and forgotten in Paris.

Repertoire 
1876: Jeanne, Jeannette et Jeanneton, opéra-comique by Charles Clairville, Alfred Delacour; music by Paul Lacôme, premiere on 27 October 1876, Théâtre des Folies-Dramatiques.
1877: Les Cloches de Corneville, opéra-comique by Robert Planquette, libretto by Clairville and Charles Gabet, at the Théâtre des Folies-Dramatiques.
 1879: Madame Favart, opéra-comique in three acts by Jacques Offenbach, libretto by Alfred Duru and Henri Chivot, Théâtre des Folies-Dramatiques .
1884: François les bas-bleus opéra-comique by Ernest Dubreuil, Eugène Humbert, Paul Burani, music by Firmin Bernicat, completed by André Messager at the Grand Théâtre de Bordeaux.
 1884: Le Grand Mogol, operetta in four acts, lyrics by Chivot and Duru, music by Edmond Audran Théâtre de la Gaîté.
 1885: Niniche, comédie-vaudeville in three acts, by Alfred Hennequin and Albert Millaud, music by Marius Boullard, Grand-Théâtre du Havre.
 1885: Les Pommes d'Or, opérette-féerie in 3 acts by Chivot, Duru, Henri Blondeau, Hector Monréal, Théâtre des Célestins.
1886: La Fille du tambour-major, Théâtre des Célestins.

References

External links 
Conchita Gélabert (Les Archives du spectacle)

 Conchita Gélabert soprano on Pinterest

1857 births
1922 deaths
People from Madrid
Conservatoire de Paris alumni
French operatic sopranos
19th-century French women opera singers
19th-century French actresses